My Living Doll is an American science-fiction sitcom that aired for 26 episodes on CBS from September 27, 1964, to March 17, 1965. It was produced by Jack Chertok and filmed at Desilu studios by Jack Chertok Television Productions, in association with the CBS Television Network.

The series was unusual in that it was bought by the network without a formal pilot, at the request of CBS's president James T. Aubrey, due to the success of Chertok's previous series, My Favorite Martian.

Series background
The series starred Bob Cummings as Dr. Bob McDonald, a psychiatrist who is given care of Rhoda Miller, a lifelike android (played by Julie Newmar) in the form of a sexy, Amazonian female, by her creator, a scientist who did not want her to fall into the hands of the military.

Rhoda's real name is AF 709, and she is a prototype robot that Dr. Carl Miller (Henry Beckman) built for the U.S. Air Force. Through a series of mishaps, she ends up in the care of Dr. Miller's friend, Air Force psychiatrist Bob McDonald, when Miller is transferred to Pakistan. Bob is initially reluctant, but soon becomes intrigued by the experiment of educating this sophisticated but naive robot. Bob's initial goal is to teach Rhoda how to be a perfect woman, which he defines as one who "does what she's told" and "doesn't talk back." He also strives to keep her identity secret.

Many episodes deal with Rhoda learning how human society works. She also begins showing (or at least emulating) rudimentary emotions as the series progresses. For example, in the episode "The Kleptomaniac", she displays a childlike, playful attitude. At one point McDonald notices this and utters, "What a goofy robot!", to which Rhoda replies, beaming, "The goofiest!" At the conclusion of this episode, Rhoda giggles without prompting after pulling a plot-resolving prank on another character. Another episode, "The Pool Shark", has Rhoda displaying apparent enjoyment in playing pool. The series does not explore whether these are truly learned behaviors or the result of programming, or if, in the fantasy context of the series, Rhoda is truly learning human emotion. (The concept of a robot gaining human emotion is a frequently visited topic in science-fiction television, with characters such as Data in Star Trek: The Next Generation, and the android leads in Holmes & Yo-Yo, Mann & Machine, and Future Cop.)

Other regular cast members included: 
Jack Mullaney as Peter Robinson, a lecherous colleague and neighbor of Bob's who decides that Rhoda is the girl of his dreams. A regular supporting character in episodes 1-20, he learns the truth in the fifth-to-last episode, after Bob is transferred to Pakistan.  As of episode 21, he becomes Rhoda's guardian (and series co-lead).
Doris Dowling as Irene Adams, Bob's sister, whom he asks to move in as his housekeeper and chaperone to keep his neighbors from thinking that something inappropriate is going on between Rhoda and him. She was dropped from the cast when Bob was transferred to Pakistan.
Nora Marlowe as Mrs. Moffat, Peter's housekeeper; added to the cast when Bob was transferred to Pakistan

Production
The show was created by Jack Chertok based on the Pygmalion–Galatea myth. CBS had been looking for a vehicle for Julie Newmar for two years and this was felt to be ideal. The show was announced in April 1964.

Filming started July 1964.

Julie Newmar later said CBS:

The New York Times, reviewing the show in September, said it:

Cummings' departure
Despite good reviews, early ratings were poor. The show was initially scheduled opposite NBC's Bonanza on Sunday nights, but was shifted to Wednesdays in December in an attempt to improve ratings. This did not work, and in January, Cummings asked to be written out of the show after 21 episodes. CBS did not announce a replacement for him, indicating that they did not want to continue the series.

At the time, reportedly Cummings and Newmar were not getting along during production, with Newmar stating in a 1965 interview that Cummings had tried to teach her how to act, was unhappy that she appeared to be getting more press attention than he was, and was "trying too desperately to hold on to his long-gone youth". However, this is denied by Newmar and show producer Howard Leeds in The Living Doll Story, a featurette included in the 2012 DVD release.

Another report said that Cummings was unhappy with the size of his role in comparison to Newmar's.

In later years, Newmar said the trouble was Cummings' addiction to methamphetamine. She says this contributed to his erratic behavior on set, as well as his increasing depression and insecurity. He demanded that the show focus more on his character. CBS refused and Cummings left.

Cumming's last appearance was in "The Witness", the show's 21st episode, which aired on 10 February 1965. The following week's episode explained that his character had been transferred to Pakistan; the Peter character learns Rhoda's secret and takes over the position of watching over her. This was the plot device for the last five episodes of the season, and the series was not renewed for a second season.

Reception

Although My Living Doll was somewhat popular during its short run, it did not rank in the top 30, as it was scheduled against highly rated shows such as Bonanza, The Virginian, and The Patty Duke Show.  As a result, it did not deliver the ratings for which network executives had hoped and was cancelled. In March 1966, Newmar made her first of 13 appearances in the recurring role of Catwoman, over the first two seasons  of Batman.

Opening credits
Two versions of the opening credits were created. The first version had Rhoda wearing short lingerie similar to a teddy; according to an interview with Newmar included on the DVD release, this version was rejected as being too risque, so a new version with Rhoda wearing a long dress (though a little suggestive of lingerie) was filmed. This latter version is the one used on the versions of the episodes that were broadcast and released to DVD; however, the unofficial circulation of several episodes used the teddy version of the credits.

Episodes

 Episode is missing.

Home media
On March 20, 2012, MPI Home Video released My Living Doll—The Official Collection, Volume 1 on DVD in Region 1. The 2-disc set features 11 episodes of the series. The episodes featured on the DVD collection were created from 16mm prints of the show held by collectors, as the one known set of original 35mm negatives were destroyed in the 1994 Northridge earthquake. It is unknown if the remaining 15 episodes exist.

In popular culture
According to The Random House Historical Dictionary of American Slang, My Living Doll is the source of the science fiction phrase "Does not compute" in popular culture.

My Living Doll producer Howard Leeds went on to create Small Wonder, a 1980s sitcom featuring a young girl robot named Vicki. He also employed composer George Greeley, who wrote the music for My Living Doll.

Leeds, when in the employ of Reg Grundy Productions Australia producing Chopper Squad, proposed and produced a new My Living Doll presentation pilot, "Billion Dollar Baby", using an all-Australian cast.

In Star Trek: Voyager, the character Seven of Nine is named after Rhoda, Robot AF709.

According to IMDB, the Gilligan's Island episode title "Gilligan's Living Doll" is a reference to this series because the creator who was previously the story editor for My Favorite Martian was offered a stake in Doll to remain with Martian; he turned this down to begin work on Gilligan.

In 2018, Jack Chertok Television Productions producer Peter Greenwood apparently had posts on his LinkedIn account stating that he had begun active development of a new My Living Doll limited series; his account also featured a bound set of the original series scripts as part of the post. The posts may also have stated that the reboot "would be more in tune with present-day morals and would change a great deal of the format to highlight the character, based on the current need for positive, intelligent and meaningful female role models."

References

External links

 
My Living Doll at Television Obscurities
My Living Doll in My Living Color at Pop Colorture

1964 American television series debuts
1965 American television series endings
1960s American comic science fiction television series
1960s American sitcoms
Androids in television
Television series about robots
Black-and-white American television shows
CBS original programming
English-language television shows
Television shows set in Los Angeles
Television series by CBS Studios